MDU Resources Group, Inc. is a U.S.-based corporation supplying products and services to regulated energy delivery and utilities related construction materials and services businesses. It is headquartered in Bismarck, North Dakota, and operates in 48 states.

Early history
MDU Resources got its start in 1924 as the Minnesota Northern Power Company. Its founder, Rolland Heskett, had previously been involved with utilities in Wisconsin and northeast Minnesota (the forerunners of Wisconsin Public Service Corporation and Minnesota Power (& Light Co.), respectively). The firm's  holdings initially consisted of the electric utility at Cushing, Oklahoma (later sold off to Oklahoma Gas & Electric), Minnesota Electric Light & Power Company, which served the Bemidji, Minnesota area (sold in 1925 to the W.B. Foshay interests — this property today comprises Otter Tail Power's Bemidji division), the Eastern Montana Light & Power Company, centered around Sidney and Glendive, Montana, and the Eastern Montana Utilities Co., which was based in Fairview, Montana. The two 'Eastern Montana' utilities became the nucleus of Montana-Dakota Utilities' operations.

Initially, Minnesota Northern was only in the business of selling electric power, but entered the natural gas business following its discovery of oil in 1936 in the Williston Basin in Eastern Montana. As it expanded across Eastern Montana and western North Dakota, it acquired the electric franchise for Miles City, Montana, after an acquisition struggle with the Montana Power Company.

Shortly after passage of the Public Utility Holding Company Act of 1935 (PUHCA), Heskett reorganized all the gas and electric subsidiaries of Minnesota Northern Power under a new name — Montana-Dakota Utilities.

Later history 

Unlike its neighboring utilities, MDU was generally not in the business of reselling energy at wholesale to other companies, with the exception of five Eastern Montana towns then served by the Mountain States Power Company. The distribution systems in these towns passed into MDU ownership by the early 1940s.

The company's common stock began trading on the New York Stock Exchange under the ticker symbol MDU in 1948. By  the 1960s it was decided that the company's headquarters should be located within its service territory, in  Bismarck, the largest town on the system, and the relocation was completed in 1968.

In 1985, the corporation realigned its operations under the name MDU Resources Group, Inc. In 1992, it acquired its first aggregates-mining company in central California,  and has continued to expand its construction materials business . Knife River Corporation is now  among the largest sand and gravel producing companies in the U.S. In 2001, Knife River sold its remaining coal-mining interests.

In 1997, MDU Resources started its utility services division, which over the years has expanded its construction services offerings and become the MDU Construction Services Group segment.

Acquisition and lawsuit
The largest addition of electric utility territory came in 1945, when MDU purchased the Dakota Public Service Company (DPSC) from NorthWestern Public Service Company (NWPS) of Huron, South Dakota. DPSC served a total of 91 towns in west-central North Dakota originally served by the Hughes Electric Company/North Dakota Power & Light Company (NDP&L) and south-central North Dakota/north-central South Dakota originally served by the Northern Power & Light Company (NP&L). When MDU examined DPSC's books after the purchase, they spent the next six years in litigation with NWPS over allegations of improper internal charges between NWPS, NP&L, and NDP&L. Both companies eventually realized the lawsuit was unproductive and they ceased litigation.

After the end of the lawsuit, MDU refocused on the growing demand for electricity and gas within its newly expanded territory and the necessary system improvements. In the late 1960s, MDU partnered with NWPS and Otter Tail Power in the construction of the Big Stone power plant near Big Stone City, South Dakota. The companies have since partnered on two base-load power plants (Big Stone and Coyote).

2016  Portland gas explosion - Loy Clark lawsuits  
The Oregon Public Utility Commission faulted MDU subsidiary Loy Clark for the 2016 Portland gas explosion that leveled a building, sent asbestos fragments flying, damaged numerous buildings and injured eight people. The damages totaled $17.2 million. The PUC faulted Loy Clark and listed the cause of the accident as Loy Clark's failure to give sufficient notifications to regulators about excavation plans.  Additionally, OSHA cited and fined Loy Clark for safety violations as a result of this incident. Ten lawsuits were filed against Loy Clark in November 2018 and two of which were by insurers who had paid out claims. Two additional lawsuits were filed against Loy Clark in December 2019.

Subsidiaries
Cascade Natural Gas Corporation, serving parts of Oregon and Washington, was acquired by MDU Resources in 2006. Intermountain Gas Company, serving parts of Idaho, was acquired by MDU Resources in 2008. Knife River Corporation provides construction materials and contracting services, including aggregate, asphalt, building materials, cement, construction services, liquid asphalt, and ready-mix concrete in 17 states.

See also
Bombard Renewable Energy
Williston Basin Pipeline

References

External links
 MDU Resources Group, Inc. (official website)

Companies listed on the New York Stock Exchange
Energy in Oregon
Natural gas companies of the United States
Electric power companies of the United States